Tombu Shomali (also Romanized as Tombū Shomālī and Tombū Shemālī) is a village in Kushk-e Nar Rural District, Kushk-e Nar District, Parsian County, Hormozgan Province, Iran. At the 2006 census, its population was 222, in 38 families.

References 

Populated places in Parsian County